Acquacotta (Italian for "cooked water") is a hot broth-based bread soup in Italian cuisine that was originally a peasant food. Its preparation and consumption dates back to ancient history, and it originated in the coastal area known as the Maremma in southern Tuscany and northern Lazio. The dish was invented in part as a means to make hardened, stale bread edible. In contemporary times, ingredients can vary, and additional ingredients are sometimes used. Variations of the dish include aquacotta con funghi and aquacotta con peperoni.

History
Acquacotta is a simple traditional dish originating in the coastal region of Italy known as Maremma, which spans the southern half of Tuscany's coast and runs into northern Lazio. The word "acquacotta" means "cooked water" in the Italian language. It was originally a peasant food, and has been described as an ancient dish, the recipe of which was derived in part by people who lived in the Tuscan forest working as colliers (charcoal makers), who were typically very poor, being "traditionally among the poorest of people". It was also prepared and consumed by farmers and shepherds in the Maremma area. Historically, the soup was sometimes served as an antipasto dish, the first course in an Italian meal. It remains a popular dish in Maremma and throughout Italy.

Acquacotta was invented in part as a means to make stale, hardened bread edible. People that worked away from home for significant periods of time, such as woodcutters and shepherds, would bring bread and other foods with them (such as pancetta and salt cod) to hold them over. Acquacotta was prepared and used to marinate the stale bread, thus softening it.

A legend about acquacotta exists in relation to the concept of stone soup, which is generally based upon a premise of a poor traveler who arrived at a village having only a stone, but convinced the villagers to add ingredients to his stone soup, creating acquacotta; variations of the legend exist.

Ingredients
Historically, acquacotta's primary ingredients were water, stale bread, onion, tomato and olive oil, along with various vegetables and leftover foods that may have been available. In the earlier 1800s, some preparations used agresto, a juice derived from half-ripened grapes, in place of tomatoes, which were not a common food in Italy prior to "the latter decades of the nineteenth century".

In contemporary times
Contemporary preparations of acquacotta may use stale, fresh, or toasted bread, and can include additional ingredients such as vegetable broth, eggs, cheeses such as Parmigiano-Reggiano and pecorino Toscano, celery, garlic, basil, beans such as cannellini beans, cabbage, kale, lemon juice, salt, pepper, potatoes and others. Some versions may use edible mushrooms such as porcini, wild herbs, and leaf vegetables and greens such as arugula, endive, mint, chard, chicory, dandelion greens, watercress, valerian and others. As the greens boil down, they contribute to the broth's flavor. The dish may be topped with a poached egg. Contemporary versions may be prepared in advance from a few hours to a day, stored in a cold place or refrigerated, and then reheated prior to serving. It can also be preserved by freezing.

Variations
Acquacotta con funghi is an aquacotta soup variation that uses porcini mushrooms as a primary ingredient. Additional ingredients include bread, stock or water, tomato conserva, Parmesan cheese, eggs, mentuccia, wild mint, garlic, olive oil, salt, and pepper. This variation's flavor and aroma has been described as based upon the porcini mushrooms that are used; parsley may also be used.

Acquacotta con peperoni is an aquacotta soup variation that includes celery, red pepper and garlic.

See also

 Bread soup
 Food history
 Garbure
 List of bread dishes
 List of Italian soups
 List of soups
 Lablabi
 Migas
 Pancotto
 Ribollita
 Wodzionka

Notes

References

External links

 Acquacotta. BBC.
 Acquacotta. James Beard Foundation.

Ancient dishes
Bread soups
Italian soups
Peasant food